Rosa sericea, the silky rose, is a species of flowering plant.

The closely related Rosa omeiensis is sometimes treated as a subspecies of R. sericea.

Distribution

Description
The flowers are  diameter, white, with (unusually for a rose) only four petals. The hips are red,  diameter, with persistent sepals, and often bristly.

Forms
There are four formae:

 Rosa sericea f. sericea
 Rosa sericea f. glandulosa T.T.Yü & T.C.Ku.
 Rosa sericea f. glabrescens Franchet.
 Rosa sericea f. pteracantha Franchet.

Cultivation and uses
Rosa sericea f. pteracantha is grown as an ornamental plant for its large, bright red thorns.

Gallery

References

sericea
Flora of China
Flora of Asia
Flora of Nepal